The Shire of Biggenden was a local government area located in the northern catchment of the Burnett River, Queensland, Australia,  south-southwest of the regional city of Bundaberg.

Primary production is the most significant industry in the region with beef and dairy cattle being predominant. Other agricultural pursuits include grain crops, piggeries, peanuts, citrus and timber. The area is also rich in minerals. Gold, bismuth and more recently magnetite have been extracted from the mine.

The biggest landmarks in the region are Mount Walsh, which can be seen prominently over much of the shire and Paradise Dam, a large reservoir formed by the damming of the Burnett River.

History

On 3 June 1905, the No. 2 division of the Shire of Burrum was excised to create the Shire of Degilbo.

On 12 July 1941, the Shire of Degilbo was renamed to become the Shire of Biggenden.

On 15 March 2008, under the Local Government (Reform Implementation) Act 2007 passed by the Parliament of Queensland on 10 August 2007, the Shire of Biggenden merged with the Shires of Eidsvold, Gayndah, Monto, Mundubbera and Perry to form the North Burnett Region.

Towns and localities
The Shire of Biggenden included the following settlements:

 Biggenden
 Coalstoun Lakes
 Dallarnil
 Didcot
 Degilbo

Population

Chairmen and mayors
 Chairmen
 1927: Noah Minchenton
1928: J.C. Robertson

 Mayors
 Betty Johnson (2004–2008)

References

External links
 University of Queensland: Queensland Places: Biggenden and Biggenden Shire

Biggenden
2008 disestablishments in Australia
Populated places disestablished in 2008